Ethiraj College for Women is an arts and science college for women in Chennai, India, managed by the Ethiraj College Trust. It was founded in 1948 by the barrister V. L. Ethiraj of Vellore.

History

Chairmen
 V. L. Ethiraj (1948–60)
 V. T. Rangaswami (1960–72)
 N. Mahalingam (1972–80)
 Justice S. Natarajan (1980–98)
 Justice S. Jagadeesan (1998-2008)
 A. M. Swaminathan, IAS (Retd.) (2008–13)
 V. M. Muralidharan (2013–19)
 Chandra Devi Thanikachalam (2019–22)
 V. M. Muralidharan (2022–present)

Principals
 Subur Parthasarathy (1948–49, 1950–52)
 Mona Hensman (1953–60)
 Evangeline Matthew (1960–76)
 K. Vasanthi Devi (1976–84)
 N. A. Qadir (1984–85)
 Keser Chander (1985–88)
 Yasodha Shanmugasundaram (1988–94)
 Indhrani Sridharan (1994-2005)
 M. Thavamani (2005–11)
 Jothi Kumaravel (2011–14)
 A. Nirmala (2014–18)
 S. Kothai (2019–22)

Ranking

Ethiraj College for Women was ranked 65 among colleges in India by the National Institutional Ranking Framework (NIRF) in 2022.

Notable alumni
Trisha Krishnan, actress
Aishwarya Rajesh, actress
Chandini Tamilarasan, actress
Sreethu Nair, Actress
Dhivyadharshini, TV host
Dhivya Suryadevara, economist, former CFO of both the General Motors, and Stripe.
Dipika Pallikal, Indian squash player
Jayanthi Natarajan, politician
Joshna Chinappa, Indian squash player
Kanimozhi Karunanidhi, politician and Thoothukudi Constituency Member of Parliament  (LS)
Latha Rajinikanth, film producer and singer
Leesha Eclairs, TV actress
Madhumila, TV actress 
Meenakshi Chitharanjan, Indian classical dancer and choreographer
Molly Easo Smith, Indian-American professor
Padma Subrahmanyam, Indian classical dancer and musician
Preetha Krishna, businesswoman
Sudha Ragunathan, singer
Sudha Shah, former Indian cricketer and national coach
Sujata Sridhar, former Indian cricketer
Sriya Reddy, actress
Shvetha Jaishankar, model, entrepreneur, author, beauty pageant title holder
Tamilisai Soundararajan, doctor, politician, and the Governor of Telangana
Thamizhachi Thangapandian, South Chennai Constituency Member of Parliament (LS)
J. Vijaya, India's first woman herpetologist
Srinisha Jayaseelan, singer
Priyanka Deshpande, television anchor and actress
Devaki Vijayaraman, television cook and the winner of MasterChef India – Tamil (season 1)
Roshini Haripriyan, television actress
Vibha Batra, author, poet, adperson

References

External links
Official website

Women's universities and colleges in Chennai
Educational institutions established in 1948
1948 establishments in India
Colleges affiliated to University of Madras
Universities and colleges in Chennai